The Tip Top Tailors Building, now known as the 'Tip Top Lofts' is a former 1920s industrial building converted to condominium lofts in Toronto, Ontario, Canada. It is located on 637 Lake Shore Boulevard West just west of Bathurst Street, near the waterfront. It was the former headquarters of Tip Top Tailors Ltd., a Canadian menswear retailer.

Description
Designed by Bishop and Miller architects using Art Deco decoration, the building was completed in 1929 and housed the manufacturing, warehousing, retail and office operations of Tip Top Tailors Ltd., a menswear clothing retailer founded in 1909 by Polish-Jewish immigrant David Dunkelman, father of Ben Dunkelman. Tip Top Tailors eventually became a part of clothing conglomerate Dylex Limited.

In 1972, the building was designated as a heritage structure by the City of Toronto. In spring 2002, Dylex sold the property to Context Development, which converted it into condominium lofts. The conversion was designed by architectsAlliance of Toronto. The conversion included the addition of six stories on the roof. The neon 'Tip Top Tailors' rooftop sign was retained and given a slant.

References

External links
 Condos.ca - See Tip Top Stats and Facts 

Buildings and structures in Toronto
Art Deco architecture in Canada
Industrial buildings completed in 1929
1929 establishments in Ontario